Itthipol Mameket is a Thai voice actor. His notable roles include Athrun Zala in Gundam Seed, Monkey D. Luffy in One Piece, Lelouch in Code Geass, and Mantaro Kinniku in Kinnikuman Nisei, where he also sing a "Karubidon Ondo" (เพลงข้าวหน้าเนื้อ) song in Thai version.

Filmography

Voice over roles

Anime dubbing
 Weiß Kreuz (UBC dub) - Aya Fujimiya
 Cheeky Angel (UBC dub) - Genzō Soga
 Tokyo Underground (UBC dub) - Rumina Asagi
 Inuyasha (Channel 9 dub) - Miroku 
 Saint Seiya: The Lost Canvas (Channel 9 dub) - Alone, El cid
 Detective Conan (Channel 9 dub) - Wataru Takagi, Hiroshi Agasa, Supporting Characters
 Rockman EXE (Channel 9 dub) - Blues
 The Prince of Tennis (Channel 9 dub) - Takeshi Momoshiro, Eiji Kikumaru
 Zatch Bell! - Kiyo Takamine
 Corrector Yui - I.R.
 Sailor Moon (Channel 9 dub, rerun on air 2012.) - Nephrite
 Fighting Spirit (Channel 9 dub) - Ichirō Miyata
 Inazuma Eleven (Channel 9 dub) - Yūto Kidō
 Fairy Tail (Channel 9 dub) - Natsu Dragneel
 Cardcaptor Sakura - Toya Kinomoto
 Tokyo Mew Mew - Masaya Aoyama, Keiichiro Akasaka
 Tenjho Tenge - Souichiro Nagi
 School Rumble - Kenji Harima
 The Mythical Detective Loki Ragnarok - Narugami
 Fruits Basket - Kyo Sohma
 Shin Mazinger Shougeki! Z Hen - Koji Kabuto
 Saint Seiya - Pegasus Seiya, Scorpio Milo
 Mobile Suit Gundam SEED - Athrun Zala, Orga Sabnak
 Mobile Suit Gundam SEED Destiny - Athrun Zala, Andrew Waltfeld
 Mobile Suit Gundam 00 - Allelujah Haptism, Saji Crossroad
 Mobile Suit Gundam AGE - Woolf Enneacle, Zeheart Galette
 Mobile Suit Gundam: Iron-Blooded Orphans - Orga Itsuka, Ein Dalton
 Yakitate!! Japan - Ryou Kuroyanagi, Pierrot Bolneze
 Kinnikuman Nisei - Mantaro Kinniku, Brocken Jr., Harabote Muscle
 Tiger & Bunny - Kotetsu T. Kaburagi/Wild Tiger 
 Slam Dunk (Dream Express dub) - Hanamichi Sakuragi
 Code Geass - Lelouch Lamperouge, Lloyd Asplund
 Eureka Seven - Matthieu, Lieutenant Dominic Sorel
 One Piece - Monkey D. Luffy
 Highschool of the Dead - Kohta Hirano
 Working!! - Hiroomi Sōma

Tokusatsu dubbing 
 Ultraman Gaia - Michifumi Inoue, Katsumi Kajio
 Kamen Rider Ryuki - Takeshi Asakura
 Kamen Rider 555 - Masato Kusaka
 Kamen Rider Blade - Hajime Aikawa
 Kamen Rider Hibiki - Hitoshi Hidaka
 Kamen Rider Kabuto - Arata Kagami
 Kamen Rider Den-O - Momotaros
 Kamen Rider Kiva - Otoya Kurenai
 Kamen Rider Decade - Yusuke Onodera
 Kamen Rider W - Shotaro Hidari
 Kamen Rider Fourze - Ryusei Sakuta
 Kamen Rider Drive - Shinnosuke Tomari
 Kamen Rider Ex-Aid - Hiiro Kagami
 Kamen Rider Build - Sento Kiryu
 Kamen Rider Zi-O - Swartz, Mondo Douan
 K-tai Investigator 7 - Keita Amishima
 Kaitou Sentai Lupinranger VS Keisatsu Sentai Patranger - Keiichiro Asaka

TV series dubbing 
 Densha Otoko (Thai PBS dub)
 D.I.E. (Channel 3 dub)

Film dubbing 
 Ratatouille - Emile
 Despicable Me - Gru
 Despicable Me 2 - Gru
 Minions - Young Gru
 Despicable Me 3 - Gru
 Avatar - Tsu'tey (Laz Alonso)
 The Chronicles of Narnia: The Lion, the Witch and the Wardrobe - Peter Pevensie (William Moseley)
 I Think I Love My Wife - Richard Cooper (Chris Rock)
 Inception - Arthur (Joseph Gordon-Levitt)
 X-Men: First Class - Azazel (Jason Flemyng)
 Ice Age: Dawn of the Dinosaurs - Buck

TV program dubbing 
 Sponge (Modernine TV dub) - Narrator
 Clever! – Die Show, die Wissen schafft/Mega Clever (Channel 9 dub) - Wigald Boning
 Kasou Taishou (Channel 9 dub) - Kinichi Hagimoto

References

External links
 Official YouTube channel

Itthipol Mameket
1972 births
Living people
Itthipol Mameket
Itthipol Mameket
Itthipol Mameket